Ophiusa reducta  is a moth of the family Erebidae. It is found in Madagascar.

Larval food-plant is Combretum indicum, a Combretaceae.

References

Ophiusa
Moths of Madagascar
Moths of Africa
Moths described in 1880